Hosanagara is a panchayat town in Shimoga district in the Indian state of Karnataka.  It is nested in western ghats of India.  The World Cattle Conference with main emphasis on cow was held in month of April 2007 in Hosanagar. The different uses of cow (not the meat) were exhibited. Near Hosanagar there is a mutt named Sri Ramachandrapura Math,  6 km from the town.

Geography 
It has an average elevation of 585 metres (1919 feet).

Hosanagar Taluk is full of forested areas. A sizable area of the Taluk is covered by the backwaters of Linganamakki Dam, built across Sharavati River. This Taluk receives heavy rainfall during monsoon season (June–October).

Hosanagar is a taluk with 30 gram panchayats. A megalithic site has been discovered at the Byse village in the Hosanagar taluka.

Climate

As this taluk is in the windward side of western ghats, this place gets heavy to heavy rainfall during June–September in the monsoon season. The average precipitation ranges from  3000-8000mm. Hulikal town gets more than 8000 mm rainfall in the year which is the wettest place  in the state.

Demographics 
 India census, Hosanagar had a population of 5042. Males constitute 51% of the population and females 49%. Hosanagar has an average literacy rate of 80%, higher than the national average of 59.5%: male literacy is 84%, and female literacy is 75%. In Hosanagar, 11% of the population is under 6 years of age.

Hosanagar Taluk is one of the seven taluks of Shimoga District, Karnataka, India.

Etymology
Hosanagar means "new town", distinguishing it from Nagara, which is located at a distance of 17 km, and a historic town of Malnad.

Constituency
Hosanagar is not  the MLA constituency of Malnad region.

Places of interest
Humcha, a village located 22 km from Taluk headquarters, is known for a historic Jain temple in the area.

Ramachandrapura Math is located at a distance of 6 km from the town of Hosanagar and karanagiri ganesha temple is located at distance of 5 km near by ramachandrapura mutt

Nagara fort, a fort of shivappanayaka keladi maha samsthana located at a distance of 15 km from the town of Hosanagara

Kodachadri, located in the amidst of western ghats is paradise for trekkers and nature enthusiast. It is 30 km from Hosanagara. On the way to Kodachadri, one can also visit Hudlumane falls, which is an enthralling waterfalls, is a must visit place in the monsoon.

Kunchikal Falls

Kunchikal Falls is located Nidagodu village near Masthikatte in Shimoga[1] district of state Karnataka.[2]Kunchikal falls cascades down rocky boulders and total height of fall is 455 meters (1493 feet) according to world waterfall database.[3]

Kunchikal falls is formed by Varahi river.

After construction of Mani Dam near Masthikatte[4] and underground power generation station[4] near Hulikal, Shimoga district, the water flow to this falls is greatly reduced and visible only during rainy season (July-Sept). As the falls is within restricted area, Gate pass is required to visit and the pass is being issued at Hosangadi village (about 15 km away). The nearest Airport is at Mangalore, situated 138 km (86 mi) from Kunchikal Falls.[5]

See also
Ripponpet
Kunchikal Falls
Masthikatte
Kundapur
Mangalore
Linganamakki Dam
Kodachadri

References 

Taluks in Shimoga District
Cities and towns in Shimoga district